Mehmet Ali Birand (9 December 1941 – 17 January 2013) was a Turkish journalist, political commentator and writer.

Biography 
He was born to İzzet and his wife Mürvet on 9 December 1941 in Beyoğlu, Istanbul. His mother was of Kurdish descent. He completed his high school education at Galatasaray High School.

Career 
Birand began his journalism career in 1964 by writing in the newspaper Milliyet. In 1992, he joined Show TV and presented the news. Birand began hosting a political show titled 32. Gün (The 32nd Day), which was first on TRT in 1985 and then moved to other private TV channels as CNN Türk and Show TV. He also presented the daily news on CNN Türk. Before his death in 2013, he worked at Kanal D, hosting the news.

He also authored several books including 30 Sıcak Gün, Diyet, Türkiye'nin Avrupa Macerası, 12 Eylül 04.00 and Emret Komutanım.

Birand was also a member of Galatasaray's board and uncommitted governance council.

In 2006, he said that JITEM had asked Mahmut Yıldırım (Yeşil) to assassinate him, but that the operation was later cancelled, after Yıldırım had already investigated Birand's home security. Birand said that MIT chief Şenkal Atasagun was one of those who had told him of this episode.

Death 
Birand died on 17 January 2013 from complications of gallbladder surgery to replace a stent at the American Hospital in Istanbul. He had been receiving cancer treatment for a while. He was 71 years old.

Newspapers worked for 
 1964–1992 Milliyet
 1992–1998 Sabah
 1999–2013 Posta
 2001–2013 Hürriyet
 2001–2011 Milliyet

Works 
Diyet
Türkiye'nin Avrupa Macerası
30 Sıcak Gün
12 Eylül 04.00 
 in English: The generals' coup in Turkey - An inside story of  12 September 1980
Emret Komutanım
32. Gün
10 Yılın Perde Arkası
Mehmet Ali Birand
Milliyet Yayınları / Aktüel Kitaplar Dizisi
Nasreddin Hodja

Notes

External links 
A short biography of Mehmet Ali Birand
Mehmet Ali Birand's Hürriyet archive

1941 births
2013 deaths
People from Beyoğlu
Milliyet people
Turkish journalists
Turkish writers
Turkish people of Kurdish descent
Turkish broadcast news analysts
Galatasaray High School alumni
Hürriyet people
Sabah (newspaper) people
Galatasaray S.K. board members
Turkish television journalists
Posta (newspaper) people
Deaths from cancer in Turkey
Deaths from pancreatic cancer
Kurdish journalists